The canton of Lot et Palanges is an administrative division of the Aveyron department, southern France. It was created at the French canton reorganisation which came into effect in March 2015. Its seat is in Saint-Geniez-d'Olt-et-d'Aubrac.

It consists of the following communes:
 
Bertholène
Castelnau-de-Mandailles
Gaillac-d'Aveyron
Laissac-Sévérac-l'Église
Lassouts
Palmas-d'Aveyron
Pierrefiche
Pomayrols
Prades-d'Aubrac
Saint-Côme-d'Olt
Sainte-Eulalie-d'Olt
Saint-Geniez-d'Olt-et-d'Aubrac
Vimenet

References

Cantons of Aveyron